Taleghani Metro Station is a station in Tehran Metro Line 1. It is located in the junction of Taleghani Ave and Dr. Mofatteh Street. It is between Darvaze Dolat Metro Station and Haft-e-Tir Metro Station.

Tehran Metro stations